In 1890, the short-lived Players' League included a team called the New York Giants.  This baseball team was managed by Hall of Famer Buck Ewing, and they finished third with a record of 74-57.  Besides Ewing, who was also a catcher on this team, the roster included several former members of the National League New York Giants, such as Hall of Famers Roger Connor, Jim O'Rourke, Hank O'Day, and Tim Keefe. The team played its home games at the Polo Grounds.

After the season, their owner, Edward Talcott, bought a minority stake in the National League Giants—in effect, merging the two clubs.

See also
 1890 New York Giants (PL) season

References

Baseball teams established in 1890
Sports clubs disestablished in 1890
Defunct Major League Baseball teams
Players' League teams
1890 establishments in New York (state)
1890 disestablishments in New York (state)
Defunct baseball teams in New York City
Defunct baseball teams in New York (state)
Baseball teams disestablished in 1890